Soul Message is an album by jazz organist Richard "Groove" Holmes which was recorded in 1965 and released on the Prestige label.

Reception

Allmusic awarded the album 4½ stars stating "Organist Richard "Groove" Holmes hit upon a successful formula on this Prestige session mixing together boogaloo rhythms with emotional solos... Groove Holmes shows that it is possible to create music that is both worthwhile and commercially successful".

Track listing 
All compositions by Richard "Groove" Holmes except as noted
 "Groove's Groove" - 7:06     
 "Daahoud" (Clifford Brown) - 5:41     
 "Misty" (Johnny Burke, Erroll Garner) - 6:03     
 "Song for My Father" (Horace Silver) - 6:08     
 "The Things We Did Last Summer" (Sammy Cahn, Jule Styne) - 6:06     
 "Soul Message" - 3:25

Personnel 
Richard "Groove" Holmes - organ
Gene Edwards - guitar
Jimmie Smith - drums

References 

Richard Holmes (organist) albums
1965 albums
Prestige Records albums
Albums recorded at Van Gelder Studio
Albums produced by Cal Lampley